Jovi-ye Majid (also Romanized as Jovī-ye Majīd; also known as Jovī, Jowvī, and Shahīd Sa‘īdī) is a village in Hoseynabad Rural District, in the Central District of Shush County, Khuzestan Province, Iran. At the 2006 census, its population was 1,284, in 163 families.

References 

Populated places in Shush County